Mink is an unincorporated community in Natchitoches Parish, Louisiana, United States, approximately  south of Shreveport. It is in Kisatchie National Forest.

Mink was one of the last places in the United States to receive traditional landline telephone service. Service began in February 2005.

See also
 Timeline of the telephone

References

Unincorporated communities in Natchitoches Parish, Louisiana
Unincorporated communities in Louisiana
Populated places in Ark-La-Tex